Philip Moeller is a journalist and primary author of the "Get What's Yours" series of books published by Simon & Schuster.

Moeller was a reporter for the Charlotte Observer and the Chicago Sun-Times, business editor for the Louisville Courier-Journal and the Baltimore Sun, and editor of The Hartford Business Journal. He later wrote for U.S. News & World Report, Money magazine, and the PBS NewsHour.

In 2015, he co-authored the New York Times bestseller, "Get What's Yours: The Secrets to Maxing Out Your Social Security." In 2016, he wrote "Get What's Yours for Medicare: Maximize Your Coverage, Minimize Your Costs." In 2021, the third book in the series was published: "Get What's Yours for Health Care: How to Get the Best Care at the Right Price."

He has received awards including the 1979 Gerald Loeb Award for Distinguished Business and Financial Journalism for Small Newspapers and was a Bagehot Fellow in Business and Economics Journalism at the Columbia Graduate School of Journalism. He is a graduate of Princeton University and has a master's degree from the Medill School of Journalism at Northwestern University.

References 

Year of birth missing (living people)
Living people
American financial writers
American male journalists
Gerald Loeb Award winners for Small and Medium Newspapers